Hansraj Morarji Public School is a combined primary, junior and senior school in Mumbai, India. It was founded in 1939 by the Bai Kabibai and Hansraj Morarji Trust. The foundation stone was laid by Sardar Patel. The school was earlier an all-boys school but now admits girls.

Campus
The campus has Rajhans Vidyalaya a CBSE affiliated senior secondary school, and Bai Kabibai Balvatika the feeder pre-primary school for Hansraj and Rajhans. The school has a cricket ground, basketball courts, football ground, tennis courts and gymnasium. It has a School Wellness Clinic called AYAKSHA for the school student's health and routine checkup. An audio-visual room for screening educational films is also present.
The HMP School is a member of Indian Public School Conference (IPSC)

The school started a Junior college in July 2008. The college provides Science and Commerce based streams along with vocational course for Information Technology.

Affiliation 
The school prepares students for Secondary Certificate Examinations (SSCs) held by the Mumbai Divisional Board of the Maharashtra State Board of Secondary and Higher Secondary Education.  Both Gujarati language also French language has been taught, streams and English language streams were available earlier but today the school is a completely English Medium School. In addition to curriculum subjects, there are also clubs covering Maths, Drama. There is also The Green Brigade Club, which is the school's Environment Club and which won the "Green School Award" in 1996.

Notable alumni 
 A. M. Naik, industrialist, CEO of L&T Ltd. Also, his father was a teacher at HMPS.
 Viren Shah of Mukund Ltd., industrialist and governor of West Bengal (1999-2004)
 Dr. Ketan Desai, former president of Medical Council of India and World Medical Association
 Amol Gupte, Bollywood screenwriter
 Arvind Trivedi, stage and television actor
 Upendra Trivedi, film and stage actor and director
 Harish Bhimani, voice artist, writer
 Rahul Vaidya, singer
 Chandrakant Pandit, national-level cricketer and cricket coach

References

External links 
 
Official alumni website 
 http://www.baikabibai.com/

Educational institutions established in 1939
Private schools in Mumbai
Boys' schools in India
Boarding schools in Maharashtra
1939 establishments in India